Abu Kishk was a Palestinian village in the Jaffa Subdistrict located 12 km northeast of Jaffa, situated 2 km northwest of the Yarkon River. The village was depopulated during the 1947–1948 Civil War in Mandatory Palestine on 30 March 1948 by the Irgun.

In 1945 the population of the village was about 1,900, about 300 of them lived in the area of the future Herzliya.

Location
Secondary roads linked it to  the Jaffa-Haifa  highway and to neighboring villages.

History

British Mandate of Palestine 
In 1925 the village school was founded. By the mid-1940s it had  108 students, including 9 girls.

At the time of the 1931 census, Abu Kishk had a population of 1007 residents, all Muslims.

In the 1945 statistics Abu Kishk had 1,900 Muslim residents, who owned a total of 17,121 dunams of land. A total of 2,486 dunums of village land was used for citrus or bananas, 14,018 was planted with cereals; while 226 dunums were irrigated or used for orchards.

1948 Palestine war
In  December 1947 and January 1948 the leaders of al-Shaykh Muwannis, Al-Mas'udiyya, Al-Jammasin al-Sharqi/Al-Jammasin al-Gharbi, and the mukhtars of Ijlil al-Qibliyya,  Ijlil al-Shamaliyya and  Abu Kishk  met with Haganah representatives  in Petah Tikva. These villages wanted peace, and promised not to harbor any Arab Liberation Armies or local Arab Militia. They further promised that, in the case they were not able to keep them out alone, they were to call on Haganah for help.

By mid-March 1948, the Alexandroni Brigade had imposed  isolation, a "quarantine", of al-Shaykh Muwannis, Ijlil al-Qibliyya, Ijlil al-Shamaliyya and  Abu Kishk. However, on 12 March LHI kidnapped  5 village notables from al-Shaykh Muwannis. This completely undermined the villagers' trust in former agreements, and many left.

Notes

Bibliography

External links
Welcome To Abu Kishk
Abu Kishk, Zochrot
Survey of Western Palestine, Map 13: IAA,  Wikimedia commons
Abu Kishk, at Khalil Sakakini Cultural Center
, by Eitan Bronstein,  with Norma Muish, from Zochrot

Arab villages depopulated during the 1948 Arab–Israeli War
District of Jaffa